Hornstedtia costata is a ginger-like plant (member of the family Zingiberaceae) native to Bangladesh, Assam, Bhutan, Arunachal Pradesh.  Previously this species has been placed in the genera Alpinia and Amomum.

References

External links

costata
Zingiberaceae
Flora of Asia